Yamla Pagla Deewana: Phir Se is a 2018 Indian Hindi-language action comedy film directed by Navaniat Singh. It is a sequel to the 2011 film, Yamla Pagla Deewana 2 and the third installment of Yamla Pagla Deewana film series. The film stars Dharmendra, Sunny Deol, Bobby Deol and Kriti Kharbanda in lead roles along with Binnu Dhillon, Mohan Kapoor and Asrani. The movie had its worldwide theatrical release on 31 August 2018.

Plot
The film revolves around 2 brothers namely Puran (Sunny Deol) and Kala (Bobby Deol). They live in Amritsar, Punjab where Puran manages the old Dawakhana of his ancestors based on Ayurveda. Kala is a notorious younger brother who wants to earn money, contradictory to Puran who wants to spread the cheaper way of medication rather than commercialization by private pharmaceutical companies. Marfatia Pharmaceuticals is one such company who offers a huge sum of money in turn for the process of making Vajrakavach, the ayurvedic remedy that cures all illnesses. He instantly rejects Marfatia's offer and punches him, causing him to bleed and he plans on taking revenge from Puran. Jaywant Parmar (Dharmendra) is an old Lawyer living as the tenant in Puran and Kale's house. He pays only Rs. 115 rent since more than 35 years and annoys Kala a lot. He is also an admirer of angels and sees a lot of Angels (Apsara) who no one can see.

A surgeon from Gujarat named Chiku (Kriti Kharbanda) is a carefree girl who drinks and parties. She wants to have a clinic of her own someday. She decides to go to Punjab to study Ayurveda under Puran. Instead, after a series of twists and turns, it is revealed that Marfatia sent her to steal the Vajrakavach. She steals the old manuscripts for the process of making Vajrakavach while everyone is out to enjoy an engagement party. She leaves for Gujarat and Kala, who has fallen for her, tries to keep contact with her, but fails.

Marfatia now, sends a legal notice to Puran as he has now patented the Vajrakavach and renamed it the Cure Medicine. Puran, now left to battle Mafatiya, contacts Parmar. They all agree and go to Gujarat and live in the same colony, unknowingly where Chiku also lives. The colony, who hates Punjabis, starts to like Puran as he cures an incurable girl with bad eyesight.

During the lawsuit, the judge is revealed to be an old friend of Parmar's, Sunil Sinha (Shatrughan Sinha). After 2 dates, Mafatiya offers Parmar 10 crores and Parmar agrees. He and Kala go to Puran but he is disappointed with both of them. As he is leaving for Punjab, Chiku arrives and confesses to have stolen the Vajrakavach.

She plans to tell the truth next day in court but Marfatia kidnaps her. Puran fights the goons and gets her back and she tells the truth in court. Marfatia Pharmaceuticals is closed down and Puran is given back his ancestral heritage. 
He tells the Ayurveda is the best medicine of all and we should preserve it.

Cast

 Dharmendra as Jaywant Parmar
 Sunny Deol as Pooran
 Bobby Deol as Kala ‘K’ / Kalia 
 Kriti Kharbanda as Chikoo
 Binnu Dhillon as Billa 
 Shatrughan Sinha as Judge Sunil "Mithoo" Sinha
 Asrani as Nanu
 Satish Kaushik as Lawyer Bedi
 Mohan Kapoor as Marfatia
 Paresh Ganatra as Paresh Patel
 Rajesh Sharma as Lawyer Bhatia
 Ashu Sharma as Preston
 Anita Devgan as Sati
 Bharat Bhatia as Sainath
 Salman Khan as Mastana (Cameo Appearance)
 Rekha as Special Appearance
 Sonakshi Sinha as Special Appearance
Gurmeet Sajan as fauji

Production

Development
The official announcement of the film was made in June 2017.

Casting
The film continues to have the franchise's original male cast: Dharmendra, Sunny Deol and Bobby Deol. However, there is a different set of leading ladies paired opposite them. In August 2017, it was reported that Kriti Kharbanda had been finalized to play the female lead in the film.

Filming
Principal photography of the film commenced in the second week of August 2017. The first schedule of the film will be shot in Ramoji Film City.

Marketing and promotion
The first look of the film was revealed by Taran Adarsh as well as Deol's Twitter handles on 13 June 2018 citing the release date to be 15 August 2018. The second poster of the film was released on 30 July 2018 by Sunny Deol on his Instagram handle which showed the release date of the film as 31 August 2018.

The first teaser of the film was released on 14 June 2018. The teaser showcased three Deols, leading lady Kriti Kharbanda and Salman Khan as narrator and a cameo appearance. A trailer was released on 10 August 2018.

Reception 
The film received generally poor reviews. All the reviews were particularly critical of the film's weak plot and slapstick comedy. Ronak Kotecha of The Times of India gave it 2.5/5 stars calling it a "loud comedy that loses much of its steam in the second half and culminates into a predictable climax."

Soundtrack

The soundtrack of the film has been composed by Sanjeev-Darshan, Sachet–Parampara, Vishal Mishra and D Soldierz while the lyrics have been written by Pulkit Rishi, Kunwar Juneja and D Soldierz. The song "Rafta Rafta" which is rapped by Rekha and sung by Sonakshi Sinha.

References

External links
 
 

Indian comedy films
Hindi-language comedy films
Films scored by Vishal Mishra
Films scored by Sachet–Parampara
2010s Hindi-language films
Films shot at Ramoji Film City
Films shot in Punjab, India
Films shot in Gujarat
Films shot in Mumbai
Films scored by Sanjeev Darshan
Indian sequel films
2018 comedy films